Lidija Benedetič-Lapajne (born 1 April 1959) is a Slovenian retired athlete. She competed in the women's high jump at the 1980 Summer Olympics and the 1984 Summer Olympics, representing Yugoslavia. She set six Yugoslav national records over the course of her career.

Personal bests:
High Jump (outdoor): 1.92 m, Worrstadt, Germany, 6 June 1985
High Jump (indoor): 1.88 m, Vienna, Austria, 31 Jan 1985

Achievements

Sources

References

1959 births
Living people
Athletes (track and field) at the 1980 Summer Olympics
Athletes (track and field) at the 1984 Summer Olympics
Yugoslav female high jumpers
Slovenian female high jumpers
Olympic athletes of Yugoslavia
Mediterranean Games bronze medalists for Yugoslavia
Mediterranean Games silver medalists for Yugoslavia
Athletes (track and field) at the 1979 Mediterranean Games
Athletes (track and field) at the 1983 Mediterranean Games
Mediterranean Games medalists in athletics
Sportspeople from Jesenice, Jesenice